Cyrtodactylus phnomchiensis  is a species of gecko that is endemic to Cambodia.

References 

Cyrtodactylus
Reptiles described in 2020